Philippe Melka is a French-American winemaker. He operates his own wine label, Melka, and has consulted for BRAND Napa Valley, Fairchild Napa Valley, Cliff Lede, Hundred Acre, Seavy, Sosie, and more.

See also
List of wine personalities

References

French viticulturists
Living people
Wine merchants
Year of birth missing (living people)